Cusack Park ( in Irish), known for sponsorship reasons as TEG Cusack Park, is a GAA stadium in Mullingar, County Westmeath, Ireland. It is the main grounds of Westmeath GAA's Gaelic football and hurling teams.

The ground, named after GAA founder Michael Cusack, was opened in 1933 and had a capacity of 15,000. However following a national review of health and safety at GAA grounds in 2011, the overall capacity was reduced to 11,500.

See also
 List of Gaelic Athletic Association stadiums
 List of stadiums in Ireland by capacity

References

Buildings and structures in Mullingar
Gaelic games grounds in the Republic of Ireland
Sports venues in County Westmeath
Westmeath GAA